Jacob Knijff (1 January 1639, Haarlem – 1681, London), also written Jacob Knyff, was a Dutch Golden Age painter.

Biography
According to Houbraken he was the teacher of Johannes Gottlieb Glauber in Paris in 1671, where he attended the funeral of Nicolaes Berchem II on 4 January 1672. He was the son of the painter Wouter Knijff and the older brother of painter Leendert Knijff, and is known for painting landscapes and seascapes.

References

External links
 

1639 births
1681 deaths
Artists from Haarlem
Dutch Golden Age painters
Dutch landscape painters
Dutch male painters
Dutch marine artists